The 27th Filmfare Awards were held in 1980.

Junoon led the ceremony with 9 nominations, followed by Gol Maal and Kaala Patthar with 8 nominations.

Junoon won 6 awards, including Best Film and Best Director (for Shyam Benegal), thus becoming the most-awarded film at the ceremony.

Hrishikesh Mukherjee received dual nominations for Best Director for his direction in Gol Maal and Jurmana, but lost to Shyam Benegal who won the award for Junoon.

Amitabh Bachchan also received dual nominations for Best Actor for his performances in Kaala Patthar and Mr. Natwarlal, but lost to Amol Palekar who won the award for Gol Maal.

Main awards

Best Film
 Junoon 
Amar Deep
Kaala Patthar
Noorie
Sargam

Best Director
 Shyam Benegal – Junoon 
Hrishikesh Mukherjee – Gol Maal
Hrishikesh Mukherjee – Jurmana
Manmohan Krishna – Noorie
Yash Chopra – Kaala Patthar

Best Actor
 Amol Palekar – Gol Maal 
Amitabh Bachchan – Kaala Patthar
Amitabh Bachchan – Mr. Natwarlal
Rajesh Khanna – Amar Deep
Rishi Kapoor – Sargam

Best Actress
 Jaya Bachchan – Nauker 
Hema Malini – Meera
Jaya Prada – Sargam
Poonam Dhillon – Noorie
Raakhee – Jurmana

Best Supporting Actor
 Amjad Khan – Dada 
Naseeruddin Shah – Junoon
Shatrughan Sinha – Kaala Patthar
Utpal Dutt – Gol Maal
Vinod Mehra – Amar Deep

Best Supporting Actress
 Helen – Lahu Ke Do Rang 
Dina Pathak – Gol Maal
Farida Jalal – Jurmana
Jennifer Kendal – Junoon
Neetu Singh – Kaala Patthar

Best Comic Actor
 Utpal Dutt – Gol Maal 
Asrani – Sargam
Deven Verma – Gol Maal
Deven Verma – Lok Parlok
Mehmood – Nauker

Best Story
 Dooriyaan – Shankar Shesh 
Gol Maal – Sailesh Dey
Junoon – Ruskin Bond
Kaala Patthar – Salim–Javed
Sargam – K. Vishwanathan

Best Screenplay
 Godhuli – Girish Karnad and B. V. Karanth

Best Dialogue
 Junoon – Satyadev Dubey

Best Music Director 
 Sargam – Laxmikant–Pyarelal 
Jaani Dushman – Laxmikant–Pyarelal
Kaala Patthar – Rajesh Roshan
Mr. Natwarlal – Rajesh Roshan
Noorie – Khayyam

Best Lyricist
 Gol Maal – Gulzar for Aane Wala Pal 
Dada – Sahir Ludhianvi for Dil Ke Tukde Tukde
Jurmana – Anand Bakshi for Saawan Ke Jhule Pade
Noorie – Jan Nisar Akhtar for Aaja Re
Sargam – Anand Bakshi for Dufliwale

Best Playback Singer, Male
 Dada – K. J. Yesudas for Dil Ke Tukde Tukde 
Jaani Dushman – Mohammed Rafi for Chalo Re Doli Uthao
Kaala Patthar – Kishore Kumar for Ek Rasta Hai Zindagi
Mr. Natwarlal – Amitabh Bachchan for Mere Paas Aao
Noorie – Nitin Mukesh for Aaja Re
Sunayana – K. J. Yesudas for Sunayana In Nazaron Ko

Best Playback Singer, Female
Meera – Vani Jairam for Mere To Giridhar Gopal
Gaman – Chayya Ganguly for Aap Ki Yaad
Ikraar – Usha Mangeshkar for Hum Se Nazar To Milao
Meera – Vani Jairam for Aeri Main To Prem Diwani
Sunayana – Hemlata for Megha O Megha

Best Art Direction
 Lahu Ke Do Rang  – Madhukar Shinde

Best Cinematography
 Junoon  – Govind Nihalani

Best Editing
 Junoon  – Diwakar Bhanudas

Best Sound
 Junoon  – Hitendra Ghosh

Critics' awards

Best Film
 Jeena Yahan

Biggest winners
 Junoon – 6/9
 Gol Maal – 3/8
 Lahu Ke Do Rang – 2/2
 Dada – 2/3 
Sargam – 1/7

See also
 29th Filmfare Awards
 28th Filmfare Awards
 Filmfare Awards

References

 https://www.imdb.com/event/ev0000245/1980/

Filmfare Awards
Filmfare